Lahaul and Spiti Assembly constituency is one of the 68 assembly constituencies of Himachal Pradesh a northern Indian state. Lahaul and Spiti is also part of Mandi Lok Sabha constituency.

Members of Legislative Assembly

Election candidate

2022

Election results

2017

See also
 List of constituencies of the Himachal Pradesh Legislative Assembly
 Lahaul and Spiti district
 Mandi Lok Sabha constituency

References

External links
 

Lahaul and Spiti district
Assembly constituencies of Himachal Pradesh